Soela Strait is the strait in Estonia, locating between Saaremaa and Hiiumaa. The strait connects Väinameri and open part of Baltic Sea.

According to ethnographer Carl Friedrich Wilhelm Russwurm, the name of strait derives from Swedish Estonian word "söäl", which means "seal".

The width of strait is about 6 km.

Several islets locates in the strait: e.g. Pihlalaid, Suurlaid.

References

Geography of Estonia